The Big Hatchet Mountains are an 18 mi (29 km) long, mountain range in southeast Hidalgo County, New Mexico, adjacent the northern border of Chihuahua state, Mexico.

The range lies just south of a westerly excursion of the Continental Divide of the Americas; it lies on the eastern perimeter of the extensive, narrow, and north–south Playas Valley, and is the center range of three mostly arid, low to moderate-elevation ranges that lie on the valley's east perimeter. The mountain range lies in the extreme northwest of the Chihuahuan Desert.

Description
It trends northwest by southeast as does the Alamo Hueco Mountains to the south; the Little Hatchet Mountains bordering the range northwest, trend similarly, but have a more true north traverse.

Geology, ecology, and access
Geologically this range is part of the Basin and Range Province which spans much of the southwestern U.S. and parts of northern Mexico. It is a fault-block range made up of Paleozoic limestone and Cretaceous shale and sandstones.

Ecologically, the Big Hatchet Mountains lie near the Chihuahuan Desert and the Sonoran Desert, but their large relief provides many ecological niches more in keeping with the mountains to the north. Notable inhabitants include bats, raptors, bighorn sheep, and javelina.

The Big Hatchet Mountains are far from population centers, and have no paved road access or developed recreation sites; they therefore see little recreational activity other than long-distance hikers who are either starting or completing the Continental Divide Trail. However, the standard route on the peak, along the South Ridge from Thompson Canyon, is straightforward.

Highpoints
Zeller Peak  is two miles north of Big Hatchet Peak.

Continental Divide National Scenic Trail
The Continental Divide lies north of the Big Hatchet Mountains and traverses the northern Playas Valley on its water divide. The Continental Divide National Scenic Trail (CDT) is routed through the Big Hatchet's on two alternative trails, one at the center and the other in the north; also subtrails lead off in a southeasterly direction. The main traverse of the CDT exits from the southwest quarter of the range, to meet the northwest end of the Alamo Hueco Mountains.

References

External links

Big Hatchet Peak at summitpost.org (Climbing info, pictures)
Big Hatchet Peak, (New Mexico Ranges, UTM table), elevation: 8356 ft
Big Hatchet Mountains, mountainzone
Greater Big Hatchet Complex on nmwild.org

Mountain ranges of New Mexico
Mountain ranges of Hidalgo County, New Mexico
New Mexico Bootheel
Great Divide of North America